Patricia Ann Meyer Spacks (born 1929) is an American literary scholar. She is the Edgar F. Shannon Professor Emerita at the University of Virginia and former President of the American Academy of Arts and Sciences and of the Modern Language Association. She specializes in eighteenth-century English Literature and also writes cultural criticism on varied subjects such as boredom, gossip, and feminism. "With remarkable breadth of reference, Spacks has written more extensively than any other feminist critic on eighteenth- and nineteenth-century English narrative".

Life
Spacks was born to Norman and Lillian Talcott Meyer in San Francisco, California. She received a B.A. from Rollins College in 1949, an M.A. from Yale University and a Ph.D. from the University of California in 1955. From 1955 to 1978 she was married to poet Barry Spacks.

She has chaired English departments at Wellesley College, Yale University, and the University of Virginia. In 1996, Spacks was elected to the American Philosophical Society. She was the first Humanities Scholar-in-Residence at the American Academy of Arts and Sciences before becoming the Academy's president from 2001 to 2006. Spacks has earned the Guggenheim Fellowship, a fellowship from the National Endowment for the Humanities, and an Honorary Doctorate from Rollins College. She has been the chair of the board of directors of the American Council of Learned Societies and a trustee of the National Humanities Center.

Selected works
 Imagining a Self: Autobiography and Novel in Eighteenth-Century England (1976)
 The Adolescent Idea: Myths of Youth and the Adult Imagination (1981)
 Gossip (1985)
 Desire and Truth: Functions of Plot in Eighteenth-Century English Novels (1990)
 Boredom: The Literary History of a State of Mind (1995)
 Privacy: Concealing the Eighteenth-Century Self (2003)
 Novel Beginnings: Experiments in Eighteenth-Century English Fiction (2006)
 On Rereading (2011)

References 

Living people
1929 births
University of Virginia faculty
Rollins College alumni
Yale University alumni
University of California alumni
Members of the American Philosophical Society
Presidents of the Modern Language Association